Happyland is a former provincial electoral division for the Legislative Assembly of the province of Saskatchewan, Canada. Centred on the town of Leader, Saskatchewan, this district was named after the Happyland rural municipality.

Created before the 4th Saskatchewan general election in 1917, this constituency was divided and combined with the districts of Kindersley (later Kerrobert-Kindersley) in the north and Maple Creek in the south before the 8th Saskatchewan general election in 1934. This area is now part of the constituencies of Cypress Hills and Kindersley.

Members of the Legislative Assembly

Election results

|-

 
|Conservative
|Wilfred Steer
|align="right"|917
|align="right"|21.84%
|align="right"|–
|- bgcolor="white"
!align="left" colspan=3|Total
!align="right"|4,199
!align="right"|100.00%
!align="right"|

|-

|Independent
|Amos Edwin Botsford Denovan
|align="right"|742
|align="right"|22.18%
|align="right"|–
|- bgcolor="white"
!align="left" colspan=3|Total
!align="right"|3,345
!align="right"|100.00%
!align="right"|

|-

 
|Independent
|A. Edward Duffy
|align="right"|2,070
|align="right"|45.66%
|align="right"|+23.48
|- bgcolor="white"
!align="left" colspan=3|Total
!align="right"|4,534
!align="right"|100.00%
!align="right"|

|-

|- bgcolor="white"
!align="left" colspan=3|Total
!align="right"|4,590
!align="right"|100.00%
!align="right"|

|-

|Independent
|William Richard Ducie
|align="right"|2,315
|align="right"|48.73%
|align="right"|-
|- bgcolor="white"
!align="left" colspan=3|Total
!align="right"|4,751
!align="right"|100.00%
!align="right"|

See also
Electoral district (Canada)
List of Saskatchewan provincial electoral districts
List of Saskatchewan general elections
List of political parties in Saskatchewan
Leader, Saskatchewan

References
 

Former provincial electoral districts of Saskatchewan